North Star is an unincorporated community in Oshawa Township, Nicollet County, Minnesota, United States, near St. Peter.  The community is located near the junction of Nicollet County Road 13 and State Highway 99 (MN 99).  Seven Mile Creek flows nearby.

References

Unincorporated communities in Nicollet County, Minnesota
Unincorporated communities in Minnesota